Daniel Pinto (born 11 September 1966) is a Franco-British financier and author based in London, United Kingdom. He is the founder, Chairman and CEO of Stanhope Capital Group, the asset management and advisory firm. He is also the founder of New City Initiative (NCI), a think tank whose members are a group of independent asset management firms in the UK and Europe.,

Early life and education 

Pinto was born in Paris, France, to a Sephardic Jewish family.  He has an MBA from Harvard University, an MA in Economics and Finance from Institut d'Etudes Politiques de Paris and a MSc in Finance from Université Paris-Dauphine.

Career

Early career 

In 1993, Pinto worked in the corporate finance department of British merchant bank SG Warburg (subsequently UBS Warburg) in London and Paris. In this capacity, he advised a number of industrial groups, institutions and governments in a range of mergers, acquisitions and privatisations.

In 2000, he became Chief Executive of a venture capital firm backed by CVC Capital Partners.

Stanhope Capital 

In 2004, Pinto founded Stanhope Capital Group, the asset management and advisory firm. In 2020, the independent investment firm operates internationally, and oversees about USD 24.0 billion dollars on behalf of entrepreneurs, families, charities and other institutions. In June 2011, the firm acquired Jewson Associates, a specialist charity adviser to UK charities and university endowments and in November 2020, the firm announced its merger with US based FWM holdings, owner of Forbes Family Trust, LGL and Optima.
 
Stanhope Capital has received numerous awards including "Asset Management Firm of the Year for Ultra High Net Worth clients" (Spears Wealth Management Awards) and "Private Investment Office of the Year" (Citywealth Magic Circle Awards, STEP Awards ).).

Pinto was named by PAM as one of the ''Top 50 Most Influential'', by Spear’s Wealth Magazine as one of the "Top 5 wealth managers in the UK" and was listed among the "Top 20 men in investment management" by CityWealth magazine.

New City Initiative 

In 2010, Pinto founded the "New City Initiative", an independent think tank aiming at giving a voice to independent, owner-managed financial institutions. The organisation interacts with ministers, legislators and regulators in the UK, France and Brussels and has produced several position papers addressing the need to make the financial system safer for investors, depositors and the economy as a whole.

In 2011, the organisation launched an internship programme for students from disadvantaged backgrounds. For its work in the area of social responsibility, NCI received the Spear’s City Champion Award.

Other Activities/ Board memberships 
In 2018, Pinto and the Stanhope Entrepreneurs Fund, managed by Stanhope Capital, became early investors in S4 Capital Plc, the digital advertising group created by Sir Martin Sorrell, when he left WPP.

Pinto is a member of the Board of S4 Capital.  Pinto is also a member of the board of Soparexo, the holding company of Château Margaux.

Author 

Pinto’s book Capital Wars" – the New East West Challenge for Entrepreneurial Leadership and Economic Success was published by Bloomsbury in the UK in January 2014. It was first published in France by Odile Jacob in February 2013 (under the title Le Choc des capitalismes) and won the Turgot prize for Economic Book of the Year as well as the HEC/Manpower prize. In this book, Pinto denies that globalisation is the cause of slow growth, unemployment and excessive debt in Western economies. Instead, he blames shareholder capitalism and insistence on short term results for dampening the growth of Western business enterprise

Daniel Pinto is a regular media commentator and contributor for a number of outlets, including International New York Times, The Independent, The Telegraph, Le Monde, Le Figaro and Les Echos.

Personal life 

Pinto who holds dual French and British citizenship lives in London. He is married to Alexandra Pisar-Pinto and has two children.

References

External links 

 "CEOs Too Focused on Short Term Gains: Pinto". Bloomberg TV Video, March 2014]
 Spear's Magazine, July 2013 
 "London-based private office recruits former UK Chancellor of the Exchequer and two new partners" The Wealthnet, 20 May 2013. (subscription required)
 CNBC Video, Interview, August 2013
 "Former BP chief executive Lord Browne joins Stanhope Capital ". The Telegraph, October 2010

1966 births
Living people
Harvard Business School alumni
Instituts d'études politiques alumni
University of Paris alumni
French people of Portuguese-Jewish descent
French chief executives
20th-century French Sephardi Jews